US Nationals may refer to:
 United States Championships (disambiguation) (sporting events)
 U.S. nationals, people who owe allegiance to the U.S. but are not U.S. citizens, mostly found in American Samoa